Skytrain Ice Rise is a large, flattish, peninsula-like ice rise of about 50 miles extent, extending from the vicinity of Meyer Hills in the Heritage Range eastward into the Ronne Ice Shelf of Antarctica.

It was mapped by United States Geological Survey (USGS) from surveys and USN air photos, 1961–66, and named by the Advisory Committee on Antarctic Names (US-ACAN) after the LC-47 Douglas Skytrain airplane (also called R4D and Dakota), used extensively in the supply and placement of U.S. field personnel in Antarctica beginning with USN Operation Highjump, 1946–47, and continuing into the late 1960s.

See also
Korff Ice Rise

Ice rises of Antarctica
Bodies of ice of Palmer Land
Filchner-Ronne Ice Shelf
Ice rises of Queen Elizabeth Land